Schaapeneiland ("Sheep Island") is an island in Saldanha Bay on West Coast, Western Cape, South Africa.

Protected area 
The island of 267,500 sq m lies in the mouth of the Langebaan lagoon, forms part of the West Coast National Park and falls under the Convention of Ramsar. Since access to the island was banned, the vegetation and marine life have recovered well. It is now a bird sanctuary that is home to many ibis and a large breeding colony of kelp gull.

History 
In 1612, the ship Pearl under Captain Samuel Castleton visited to ship drinking water. Eleven years later, Icelander Jon Olafsson and his ships Christianshaven and Flensburg visited the island and found barrels of whale oil. This indicated French visitors. Jan van Riebeeck sent Sijmon Turver to the area shortly after his settlement at the Cape. His company found neatly packaged sealskins and empty barrels here, again an indication of French visitors. Turver starts here with a sheep farm. But in 1655 and again in 1670 the French are here again and slaughter of the sheep. During the American War of Independence, a skirmish even took place on the island. Sheep Island has never been a good source of guano.

Other islands 
Malgas (island), Gulls, Mark and Jutten lie in the Saldanha Bay. Vondeling is just outside the bay.

See also 
 List of islands of South Africa

Bibliography 
 Burman, José and Stephen Levin: The Saldanha Bay story. Cape Town: Human & Rousseau, 1974. ISBN 0-7981-0456-2
 Groenewald, J.A .: Sheep... not just another West Coast island. Lantern, July 1985, volume 34, no. 3

Islands of South Africa